Joey Gibson may refer to:

Joey Gibson (model) (born 1945), American female model for Playboy magazine
Joey Gibson (political activist) (born 1983), American male political activist and founder of Patriot Prayer